Winneke is a surname. Notable people with the surname include:

Henry Winneke (1908–1985), Australian judge
John Winneke (1938–2019), Australian judge
Nathan Winneke, American bassist